Fishing (French: La pêche à la ligne) is a painting by François Boucher, from 1757.

Description
The painting is an oil on canvas with dimensions of 150 x 188 centimeters. It is in the collection of the Grand Trianon, in Versailles.

References

Sources
Pierre Lemoine (ed.) Versailles and Trianon: Guide to the Museum and National Domain of Versailles and Trianon, Réunion des musées nationaux, 1990

External links
http://collections.chateauversailles.fr/?permid=permobj_b98981b8-0e7f-4c86-a632-3f49b5090ea9#4c9d24a0-368b-493d-80f3-135d64f2c44e
http://www.photo.rmn.fr/C.aspx?VP3=SearchResult&IID=2C6NU044PHY5

1757 paintings
Paintings in the collection of the Palace of Versailles
Paintings by François Boucher
Works about fishing